Paul Murray (born 31 August 1976) is an English football coach and former professional player who was most recently the youth academy manager at Oldham Athletic before leaving that position in July 2021.

Playing career
Murray was born on 31 August 1976, in Carlisle, Cumbria, England. He started his career at Carlisle United and made his Football League debut for them on 27 December 1993, coming on as a substitute against Darlington. In May 1996 he joined Queens Park Rangers on loan, making his debut at Nottingham Forest. After the Hoops' relegation that season, he joined the team permanently for a transfer fee of £300,000. Whilst at QPR he was called up four times for the England U21 squad, and in February 1998 he made his solitary appearance for England B as a substitute against Chile. He enjoyed a successful time at Loftus Road, playing 140 league games before he joined Premiership club Southampton in July 2001, though he played only one game for the south coast side.

In December 2001 Murray joined Oldham Athletic, where he spent three and a half years, before he joined Portuguese club Beira-Mar. He re-joined Carlisle United in the close-season of 2006 after their promotion to League One, and scored against Doncaster Rovers in the opening game of the 2006–07 season. This was the first match for new manager Neil McDonald. He was released by the club in May 2007.

Murray joined newly promoted Scottish Premier League outfit Gretna in June 2007 on a one-year contract.

With his contract expired at Gretna, Murray turned down a number of clubs to move south of the border and join League Two side Shrewsbury Town in May 2008, alongside former teammate Stephen Hindmarch. After two years at the club he was released on 14 May 2010.

He joined Hartlepool United on trial in the summer of 2010 and signed a short-term deal with the club in August 2010. Murray extended his contract with Hartlepool and won their player of the year trophy in the 2011–12 season. Murray was released by Hartlepool midway through the 2012–13 season, and re-signed by Oldham Athletic on a contract until the end of the season, returning to the club after almost nine years.

Management career
Murray completed his coaching badges alongside former Manchester United and England defender Phil Neville.

After a successful spell as a coach at Oldham Athletic, Murray joined League Two club Hartlepool United as manager on 23 October 2014, with Willie Donachie assisting him. Murray was sacked by Hartlepool following defeat by non-League club Blyth Spartans just six weeks after taking the reins at the League Two club.

In the summer of 2015, Murray was appointed as a coach at Barrow, but departed the club on 4 September, after seven games of the season.

Murray joined Fleetwood Town as the head coach of their development squad in November 2016. On 13 June 2018, Murray left Fleetwood Town to become first-team coach at Carlisle United.

Managerial statistics

Honours
Individual
Hartlepool United Player of the Year: 2012

References

External links
Paul Murray profile at Vital Hartlepool

1976 births
Living people
Footballers from Carlisle, Cumbria
English footballers
English people of Scottish descent
Association football midfielders
England under-21 international footballers
England B international footballers
Premier League players
English Football League players
Scottish Premier League players
Expatriate footballers in Portugal
Primeira Liga players
Carlisle United F.C. players
Queens Park Rangers F.C. players
Southampton F.C. players
Oldham Athletic A.F.C. players
S.C. Beira-Mar players
Gretna F.C. players
Shrewsbury Town F.C. players
Hartlepool United F.C. players
Hartlepool United F.C. managers
English Football League managers
Sheffield Wednesday F.C. non-playing staff
Fleetwood Town F.C. non-playing staff
Carlisle United F.C. non-playing staff
Barrow A.F.C. non-playing staff
Oldham Athletic A.F.C. non-playing staff
English football managers